Väinö Huuhtanen (3 April 1896, in Kivennapa – 5 May 1951) was a Finnish farmer, civil servant and politician. He served as a Member of the Parliament of Finland from 1929 to 1933, representing the Agrarian League.

References

1896 births
1951 deaths
People from Vyborg District
People from Viipuri Province (Grand Duchy of Finland)
Centre Party (Finland) politicians
Members of the Parliament of Finland (1929–30)
Members of the Parliament of Finland (1930–33)
University of Helsinki alumni